Buffalo Bill in Rome is a 1949 black-and-white Italian Western film directed by Giuseppe Accatino. It is set in 1905 with Buffalo Bill as the main character.

Cast

References

External links
 

1949 films
1949 Western (genre) films
Italian Western (genre) films
Italian black-and-white films
Cultural depictions of Buffalo Bill
1940s Italian films